Walter Edmund Roth (2 April 1861 – 5 April 1933) was a British colonial administrator, anthropologist and medical practitioner, who worked in Queensland, Australia and British Guiana between 1898 and 1928.

Roth and his brother, Henry Ling Roth, are the subject of a joint biography by Russell McDougall & Iain Davidson: The Roth Family, Anthropology, and Colonial Administration (2008).

Queensland 
Roth was appointed the first Northern Protector of Aboriginals in 1898 and was based in Cooktown, Queensland. From 1904 to 1906 he was Chief Protector and part of his duties was to record Aboriginal Australian cultures.

The first three of his Bulletins on North Queensland ethnography were published in 1901, numbers 4 to 8 appearing between 1902 and 1906. In 1905 he was appointed a Royal Commissioner to inquire into the condition of the Aboriginal people of Western Australia, and in 1906 he was made government medical officer, stipendiary magistrate. The remainder of Roth's bulletins on North Queensland ethnology, began to appear in the Records of the Australian Museum at Sydney in 1905; and numbers 9 to 18 will be found in volumes VI to VIII.

British Guiana 
In 1906 Roth was made protector of Indians in the Pomeroon district of British Guiana.

He was given charge of the Demerara River, Rupununi and Northwest districts in 1915.

In 1924 his valuable An Introductory Study of the Arts, Crafts, and Customs of the Guiana Indians was published at the government printing office at Washington, U.S.A., appended to the Thirty-eighth Annual Report of the Bureau of American Ethnology. Though called an introductory study this is an elaborate work of well over 300,000 words with hundreds of illustrations. Another volume, Additional Studies of the Arts, Crafts, and Customs of the Guiana Indians was published as Bureau of American Ethnology Bulletin No. 91 (1929).

Roth retired from the government service in 1928, and became curator of the Georgetown museum of the Royal Agricultural and Commercial Society, and government archivist.

Towards the end of his life he translated and edited Richard Schomburgh's Travels in British Guiana.

The Walter Roth Museum of Anthropology in Georgetown, Guyana was later named in his honour.

Controversies
A "vigorous Protector" in North Queensland, according to historian Barrie Reynolds, "Roth attracted "the hostility of the local European residents" for his advocacy on behalf of Indigenous Australians.

It was, however, the reaction to his controversial anthropological research that would trigger Roth's departure from Queensland. In either 1900 or 1901, Roth paid an Aboriginal couple to demonstrate a sexual position of which he took photographs. In 1904 and 1905, speeches in the Queensland Parliament on this and other aspects of his work were said to form "a pile as high as the Eiffel Tower". According to V. B. (Joe) Lesina MP: "Hansard teemed with speeches delivered against the administration of Dr Roth until they had a pile as high as the Eiffel Tower, and the Minister brushed everything aside as he would a fly from his aristocratic nose". Roth attempted to defend his actions by stating that the photographs were taken for purely scientific purposes, Social Scientist Helen Pringle (School of Politics and International Relations) writes of the episode that in her opinion: "Forcing, or persuading, Aborigines to perform sexual acts like performing bears for a white male audience fits squarely even within then current criteria of enslavement, a heinous crime that shocks the conscience of mankind then and now." The controversy contributed to his resignation on the grounds of ill health and departure for British Guiana in 1906.

Publications

References

External links
 
 Barrie Reynolds, 'Roth, Walter Edmund (1861 - 1933)', Australian Dictionary of Biography, Online Edition, Australian National University Accessed 6 February 2009
 Roth, Walter Edmund (1907-1910) North Queensland Ethnography Bulletins, Records of the Australian Museum on-line Accessed 24 February 2019
 

1861 births
1933 deaths
Australian anthropologists
British anthropologists
Alumni of University College London
Civil servants from London
British expatriates in Australia
People educated at University College School
Australian numismatists